Igor Alexandrovich Plekhanov (July 26, 1933 in Ufa, Russian SFSR – August 1, 2007) was a Soviet speedway rider who finished second in the Speedway World Championship in 1964 and 1965. He was the first Soviet rider to appear in a World Final. He was the USSR National Champion in 1960, 1963, 1965 and 1968. He also coached the USSR national team from 1970 until 1972.

World Final appearances

Individual World Championship
 1961 -  Malmö, Malmö Stadion - 13th - 4pts
 1962 -  London, Wembley Stadium - 10th - 7pts
 1964 -  Göteborg, Ullevi - 2nd - 13pts
 1965 -  London, Wembley Stadium - 2nd - 13pts
 1966 -  Göteborg, Ullevi - 8th - 8pts
 1967 -  London, Wembley Stadium - 4th - 12pts
 1968 -  Göteborg, Ullevi - Reserve - Did not ride

World Team Cup
 1964 -  Abensberg, Abensberg Stadion (with Boris Samorodov / Gennady Kurilenko / Yuri Chekranov) - 2nd - 25pts (8)
 1965 -  Kempten (with Yuri Chekranov / Gennady Kurilenko / Vladimir Sokolov / Viktor Trofimov) - 4th - 7pts (1)
 1966 -  Wrocław, Olympic Stadium (with Viktor Trofimov / Boris Samorodov / Farid Szajnurov) - 2nd - 25pts (6)
 1967 -  Malmö, Malmö Stadion (with Boris Samorodov / Gabdrakhman Kadyrov / Viktor Trofimov / Farid Szajnurov) - 3rd= - 19pts (9)

References

External links
 Professor Who Conquered Wembley

1933 births
2007 deaths
Russian speedway riders
Soviet speedway riders
Sportspeople from Ufa